Gravitron is the sixth studio album by American rock band The Atomic Bitchwax, released in 2015 via Tee Pee Records.

Track listing
 "Sexecutioner" – 2:48
 "No Way Man" – 3:22
 "It's Alright" – 2:56
 "War Claw" – 2:52
 "Coming in Hot" – 3:54
 "Fuckface [Explicit]" – 2:52
 "Proto World" – 4:03
 "Down with the Swirl" – 3:04
 "Roseland" – 2:59
 "Ice Age "Hey Baby"" – 4:45

Personnel
Chris Kosnik – bass, vocals
Finn Ryan – guitar, vocals
Bob Pantella – drums, percussion

References

External links
 
 Tee Pee Records
 Gravitron LP/CD

2015 albums
The Atomic Bitchwax albums
Tee Pee Records albums